105–123 St Mark's Road in the London Borough of Kensington, are Grade II listed houses with Historic England. They were built between 1977 and 1979 and designed by Jeremy and Fenella Dixon.

References

1979 in London
Grade II listed houses in the Royal Borough of Kensington and Chelsea
Houses completed in 1979
North Kensington
Postmodern architecture in the United Kingdom